Audioscopiks is a 1935 American short documentary film directed by Jacob F. Leventhal and John A. Norling. The main point of the short was to show off 3-D film technology. The film was nominated for an Academy Award at the 8th Academy Awards in 1935 for Best Short Subject (Novelty).

This was MGM's first film in 3-D, filmed using the red-green anaglyph process, with prints produced by Technicolor. Current prints appear to have faded to a crimson-cyan color, causing ghosting to occur when viewed. Audioscopiks was followed by The New Audioscopiks (1938), and by Third Dimensional Murder (1941).

Synopsis
Audience members are given a lesson on how 3-Dimensional movies are made. After being taught about 3-D, patrons are then instructed to put on their 3-D glasses. They are then given a demonstration of 3-D with various objects moving towards the camera, including a ladder, a baseball being thrown and a woman on a swing. Smith narrates each short clip, most being 20 seconds or less.

Cast
 Pete Smith as Narrator (voice)

References

External links

1935 films
1935 documentary films
1935 short films
1930s 3D films
1930s short documentary films
1930s English-language films
3D short films
3D documentary films
American short documentary films
Black-and-white documentary films
Films produced by Pete Smith (film producer)
Documentary films about the film industry
Metro-Goldwyn-Mayer short films
1930s American films